Just Me and You may refer to: 

Just Me and You (1978 film)
Just Me and You (2019 film)